Oak Grove School may refer to:

in India
 Oak Grove School, Mussoorie

in the United States
(by state)
 Oak Grove School (Prairieville, Alabama), listed on the NRHP in Alabama
 Oak Grove Rosenwald School, Oak Grove, Arkansas, listed on the NRHP in Sevier County, Arkansas
 Oak Grove School (Oak Grove Community, Arkansas), listed on the NRHP in Grant County, Arkansas
 Oak Grove School (Ojai, California)
 Oak Grove School (Winston-Salem, North Carolina), listed on the NRHP in North Carolina
 Oak Grove School (Fargo, North Dakota)
 Oak Grove Schoolhouse (Hood River, Oregon), near Hood River, Oregon, listed on the NRHP in Hood River County, Oregon

See also
Oak Grove (disambiguation)
Oak Grove High School (disambiguation)
Oak Grove Elementary School (disambiguation)
Oak Grove School District (disambiguation)